The Museum of the Land of Frankincense (aka the Land of Frankincense Museum) is a museum in Salalah, Dhofar Governorate, Oman, based on frankincense, in association with the Al-Baleed Archaeological Park, a UNESCO World Heritage Site.

See also
 Land of Frankincense
 List of museums in Oman

References

External links
 The Land of Frankincense guide book 

Land of Frankincense
Museums with year of establishment missing
History museums in Oman
Buildings and structures in Salalah
Incense